is a Japanese politician of the Komeito party and a member of the House of Councillors in the National Diet of Japan.

Early life
A native of Nakaminato (now Hitachinaka), Ibaraki and he was raised in Hitachi until his graduation from public senior high school. His mother was a teacher of the elementary school. After graduating from the University of Tokyo with a B.L. degree in 1978, he became a lawyer in 1982.

Political career
He was elected to the House of Representatives for the first time in 1990. After losing his seat in 1996, he ran unsuccessfully for the House of Representatives in 2000. In 2001 he was elected to the House of Councillors for the first time. He became the party's leader on 8 September 2009 after the party suffered a major defeat In the 2009 Japanese general election. New Komeito lost ten seats, including that of party leader Akihiro Ota and general secretary Kazuo Kitagawa. On 8 September 2009, Yamaguchi replaced Ota as president of New Komeito.

Yamaguchi's term as party leader expired in September 2012, and he was re-appointed unopposed for another two years on 22 September 2012. No vote was required, as he was the only candidate. He has continually been reelected since then.

Yamaguchi has come out in support of the Selective Surname System for married couples, as well as voting rights for permanent foreign residents.

Personality 
Known for his mild-mannered personality. Compared to the former Komeito lawmakers such as his predecessor, Ota, he has a softer appearance and is considered to be a major factor in his appointment as a representative. As a politician, it is not always an advantage, and because of its good personality, it is said that there are no enemies but no allies around Nagatacho.

The nickname among the supporters and on Nico Nico Live is "Natchan." In 2001, when he ran for the House of Councilors election for the first time in the 19th House of Councilors election, he was given a metal badge imitating Natsumi-kan by his supporters .Summer oranges badge 2013 of the 23rd member of the House of Councilors ordinary election is but mounted.

References

External links 
  in Japanese.

Members of the House of Councillors (Japan)
University of Tokyo alumni
1952 births
Living people
Politicians from Ibaraki Prefecture
Members of the House of Representatives (Japan)
New Komeito politicians
20th-century Japanese lawyers
Members of Sōka Gakkai
People from Hitachinaka, Ibaraki